Linfield F.C. is a professional association football club based in Belfast, Northern Ireland. The club plays in the NIFL Premiership, the highest level of the Northern Ireland Football League. They have played at their current home ground, Windsor Park, since 1905. Previous to this they had played at Ulsterville Avenue from 1889 until 1905 and The Meadow from their foundation in 1886 to 1889. They were one of the founding clubs of the league in 1890, and since that time the club has competed in numerous nationally and internationally organised competitions.

Players who have made 100 or more appearances for Linfield are listed below. Players are listed according to the date their first contract was signed with the club.

Forward Tommy Dickson is Linfield's record goal scorer, with 454 goals in 660 appearances between 1948 and 1965. A one-club man and former club captain, defender Noel Bailie holds the record for the most Linfield appearances, playing 1,013 times for the club during a career that spanned 22 years between his debut in 1989 and his retirement in 2011.

Players

Notes:
Appearances and goals are counted for competitive matches in all first-team competitions. Wartime matches and friendly/pre-season matches are excluded.
Substitute appearances are listed in parentheses (if known) and are included in the total.
Players listed in bold are still active at the club.
 

 
Lists of association football players by club
Belfast-related lists
Stadiums
Association football player non-biographical articles